Ophiderma is a genus of treehoppers in the family Membracidae. There are about 17 described species in Ophiderma.

Species
These 17 species belong to the genus Ophiderma:

 Ophiderma compacta Gibson & Wells c g
 Ophiderma definita Woodruff, 1919 c g b
 Ophiderma evelyna Woodruff c g b
 Ophiderma fascipennis Funkhouser c g
 Ophiderma flava Goding c g b
 Ophiderma flavicephala Goding c g b
 Ophiderma gloveri Goding 1893 c g
 Ophiderma grisea Woodruff c g b
 Ophiderma infantilis Ball c g
 Ophiderma mus Fowler c g
 Ophiderma pallida Van Duzee c g
 Ophiderma panda Ball c g
 Ophiderma planeflava Fairmaire c g
 Ophiderma pubescens Emmons c g b
 Ophiderma salamandra Fairmaire, 1846 c g b
 Ophiderma stonei Ball c g b
 Ophiderma tricincta Ball c g

Data sources: i = ITIS, c = Catalogue of Life, g = GBIF, b = Bugguide.net

References

Further reading

External links

 

Smiliinae
Auchenorrhyncha genera